The Porter from Maxim's (French: Le chasseur de chez Maxim's) is a 1927 French silent comedy film directed by Roger Lion and Nicolas Rimsky and starring Rimsky, Pépa Bonafé, and Simone Vaudry. It is based on the 1923 play of the same title, which has been made into films several times.

It was made by Films Albatros, a company established by exiles from the Russian Revolution. Art director Lazare Meerson worked on the film's set design. It was released in Germany in 1928 by the giant UFA.

Cast
 Nicolas Rimsky as Julien Pauphilat  
 Pépa Bonafé as Totoche  
 Simone Vaudry as Mimi Pauphilat  
 Eric Barclay as Marquis de la Guérinière  
 Valeska Rimsky as Claire, Mimi's aunt  
 Max Lerel as Octave  
 Emile Royol as Jacobin Candebec  
 Yvonneck as Florent Carambagnac  
 Lou Davy 
 Olga Day as Cricri  
 Alexej Bondireff

References

Bibliography
 Rearick, Charles. Paris Dreams, Paris Memories: The City and Its Mystique. Stanford University Press, 2011.

External links

1927 films
Films directed by Roger Lion
Films directed by Nicolas Rimsky
French silent feature films
French comedy films
1927 comedy films
Films set in Paris
French films based on plays
French black-and-white films
Silent comedy films
1920s French films
1920s French-language films